Wilfred George Lambert FBA (26 February 1926 – 9 November 2011) was a historian and archaeologist, a specialist in Assyriology and Near Eastern Archaeology.

Early life
Lambert was born in Birmingham, and, having won a scholarship, he was educated at King Edward's School, Birmingham. He obtained two degrees, in Classics and Oriental Languages, at Christ's College, University of Cambridge.

Academic career
Lambert taught and researched at the University of Birmingham for thirty years, during which period he made weekly trips to work on deciphering cuneiform tablets in the British Museum. After retirement, he worked with the Museum on their Catalogue of the Western Asiatic Seals Project, dealing with the inscriptions on the seals. In January 2010, Professor Lambert and Dr Irving Finkel identified pieces from a cuneiform tablet that was inscribed with the same text as the Cyrus Cylinder.

Lambert was an external consultant for the Chicago Assyrian Dictionary. His work, 'Introduction: the transmission of the literary and scholarly texts', in  Cuneiform Texts in the Metropolitan Museum of Art II: Literary and scholastic texts of the first millennium BC, was used as background material for The Higher Education Academy's project, Knowledge and Power in the Neo-Assyrian Empire. He was also noted for his new discoveries in relation to the Gilgamesh text.

Personal life
Lambert was a Christadelphian, and a conscientious objector. From 1944, he worked in a horticultural nursery north of Birmingham in lieu of military service and supervised Italian prisoners of war in their work. Later, in his spare time, he was editor of one of his church's quarterly magazines. Lambert was a lifelong vegetarian.

Appointments and memberships
 1959–64: Associate Professor and Chair of Oriental Seminary, Johns Hopkins University
 1970–93: Professor of Assyriology, University of Birmingham.
 1984: President of the Society for Old Testament Study.

Lambert was elected a Fellow of the British Academy in 1971. He was also a presenting member of the Rencontre Assyriologique Internationale (International Congress of Assyriology and Near Eastern Archaeology).

Bibliography
This is a partial bibliography:

Books
 Morals in ancient Mesopotamia Jaarbericht 15. Ex Oriente Lux. (1957–58) pp184–196.
 Babylonian Wisdom Literature 1960. (221.849.2 L222)
 A new Babylonian Theogony and Hesiod W. G. Lambert and Peter Walcot (1931–2009). Kadmos 4 (1965) pp64–72.
 Ancient Near Eastern seals in Birmingham Collections (1966)
 Atra-Hasis: The Babylonian Story of the Flood by W. G. Lambert, A. R. Millard, and Miguel Civil. (Oxford 1969).
 Catalogue of the Cuneiform Tablets in the Kouyunjik Collection of the British Museum  (Jan. 1992)
 Art of the Eastern World by Geza Fehérvári, W. G. Lambert, Ralph H. Pinder-Wilson, and Marian Wenzel (1996)
 The Qualifications of Babylonian Diviners W.G. Lambert in Festschrift für Rykle Borger (1998).
 Cuneiform Texts in the Metropolitan Museum of Art. Volume II: Literary and Scholastic Texts of the First Millennium BC edited by Ira Spar and W. G. Lambert. (2005)
 Babylonian Oracle Questions Eisenbrauns, 2007
Babylonian Creation Myths Eisenbrauns, 2013

In honour of
 Wisdom, Gods and literature: studies in Assyriology in honour of W.G. Lambert By Wilfred G. Lambert, A. R. George, Irving L. Finkel 2002 462pp

Conference papers
 Babylonian Siege Equipment. 52e Rencontre Assyriologique Internationale. Krieg und Frieden im Alten Vorderasien, Münster, 17–21 July 2006

Book Reviews
 Review of Erica Reiner Astral Magic in Babylonia in The Journal of the American Oriental Society 1999
 Review of Charles Penglase Greek Myths and Mesopotamia: Parallels and Influence in the Homeric Hymns and Hesiod. 1997 in The Journal of the American Oriental Society

References

External links
 Entry for Wilfred Lambert, British Academy
 'Birmingham-born historian and archaeologist Wilfred Lambert dies', Birmingham Post (01/12/11)

1926 births
2011 deaths
Academics of the University of Birmingham
Alumni of Christ's College, Cambridge
Assyriologists
British conscientious objectors
Christadelphians
English Assyriologists
English Christians
Fellows of the British Academy
Johns Hopkins University faculty
Presidents of the Society for Old Testament Study